Cameron James Edwards (born 27 March 1992) is an Australian-born Singaporean professional footballer who plays as a midfielder for Cockburn City and the Singapore national team. Edwards previously trained with the Nike Football Academy after being released by Reading in May 2012.

Career

Perth Glory
Born in Sydney, Edwards made his professional debut in the A-League for Perth Glory on 23 January 2011 against Wellington Phoenix, coming on as a substitute in the 84th minute of the game in a 4–0 loss.

Reading
On 29 April 2011, it was announced he had signed with Championship side Reading along with his younger brother Ryan. On 2 May 2012 Reading announced that Cameron had been released by the club.

Melbourne Heart
On 31 December 2012 it was announced that Edwards had joined A-League side Melbourne Heart following a stint at the Nike Football Academy.

Perth Glory
Edwards signed with Perth Glory in May 2013, linking up with his father. His brother would later join the Glory on a season long loan. Edwards made his debut for the Glory on 20 October 2013, coming on as a 59th-minute substitute for Steven McGarry, in their 0-0 away draw against Newcastle Jets.

Personal life
Cameron is a son of former Australian international Alistair Edwards, his mother is a Singaporean national, and he is the older brother of fellow footballer Ryan.

References

External links
Reading profile

1992 births
Living people
Australian people of Singaporean descent
Association football midfielders
Perth Glory FC players
Reading F.C. players
Melbourne City FC players
A-League Men players
National Premier Leagues players
Sportsmen from New South Wales
Soccer players from Sydney
Nike Academy players
Australian soccer players